Carmel Point also known as the Point and formerly called Point Loeb and Reamer's Point, is an unincorporated community in Monterey County, California, United States. It is a cape located at the southern city limits of Carmel-by-the-Sea and offers views of Carmel Bay, the mouth of Carmel River, and Point Lobos. Carmel Point was one of three major land developments adjacent to the Carmel city limits between 1922 and 1925. The other two were Hatton Fields,  between the eastern town limit and Highway 1, and Carmel Woods,  tract on the north side.

History

The Carmel Point began with the  Rumsen Ohlone Native American tribe, who inhabited the area in the 6th-century. Native American artifacts were found on Carmel Point at the beginning of the 20th century. The Spanish explorers and missionaries arrived in the late 18th century and erected, within the Ohlone region, the Mission San Carlos Borroméo de Carmelo (founded in 1770). In 1834, the Mexican land grant ranchos took over the mission land and property. In 1848, Mexico ceded to California as a result of the Mexican–American War.

The Carmel Point land is hilly to the east, but flat to the west, which is closest to the Carmel Bay. There are about 23 people per square kilometer in Carmel Point's relatively small population. The area around the Point has large granite boulders that expose rocky layers. In the region around Carmel Point, beaches, cliffs, valleys, bays, and plains are common.

John Martin, acquired the lands surrounding the Carmel mission in 1859 that included the Carmel Point. He built the Martin Ranch on  that went as far as the
Carmel River State Beach to the homes along Carmel Point. The ranch became known as the Mission Ranch because it was so close to the Carmel Mission. They farmed potatoes and barley and had a milk dairy.

The Carmel Development Company, headed by Frank Hubbard Powers and James Franklin Devendorf, bought part of the Martin Ranch between 12th Avenue and down to Santa Lucia Avenue, from John Martin in ca. 1902. They took over the entire Carmel Point and subdivided it.

The first house to go up in the area was Driftwood Cottage built by George W. Reamer for Florence Wells on the oceanside of Carmel Point in 1908, on the corner of Scenic Drive and Ocean View Avenue (still standing). Wells's neighbor was George W. Reamer, which is where the name Reamer's Point came from. Driftwood became the home of actress Jean Arthur from the 1940s to 1977. She sold the home in 1977 for $435,000. She then purchased Bay Cottage, located at 2313 Bay View, where she lived until her death in 1991.

During the 1910s, early property owners bought land and built their homes. There was no electricity, gas, or paved roads during this time. By 1925, the only homes on Carmel Point were the homes of Col. Fletcher Dutton, poet Robinson Jeffers and his wife Una, Playwright Charles King Van Riper, musician and attorney Edward G. Kuster, George W. Reamer, and Florence Wells.

In 1912 Philip Wilson Sr. (1862-1944) (of the Philip Wilson Building), purchased a small writers studio at 14th Avenue and San Antonio Street in Carmel Point, from writer John Fleming Wilson (1877-1922), who had lived there for several years. John Wilson named the area "Point Loeb," after Professor Jacques Loeb of the University of California, one of the professors who had summer homes on Dolores Street, on what became known as "Professors' Row." 

Wilson Sr., converted the studio into a clubhouse for the first and only Carmel Golf Course. The nine-hole golf course was built on Carmel Point and followed the coastline from the south end of the beach to the Carmel River. It was later sold when Wilson Sr., went into the service during World War I and the land was subdivided into lots. In 1990, the clubhouse became a one bedroom residence on San Antonio Street.

One of the first homes built on Carmel Point was built in 1919, when Robinson Jeffers constructed Tor House, naming it for the craggy knoll, the "tor" on which it was built. Jeffers contracted Mike Murphy, an established Carmel developer, to help build a stone cottage. They brought the granite from the beach below to build the house. At this time, Carmel Point was a treeless bluff with few buildings.

Jeffers coined the word "inhumanism", which is the belief that humankind is too self-centered to the "astonishing beauty of things." In the poem Carmel Point, Jeffers called on humans to "uncenter" themselves.

In 1920, the Medieval European-style Kuster home at 26025 Ocean View Avenue was built by Lee Gottfried, with granite stones from the surf at Carmel Point. It was built by Una Jeffers' ex-husband and lawyer Edward G. Kuster (1878–1961) after he followed Una and Robinson Jeffers from Southern California to Carmel. When Kuster built his house, he built it near to the Jeffers property and Bootleg Point.

Ernest Bixler built a large two-story Tudor-style T. J. Brennan House, with a Carmel stone exterior located at the corner of 26097 Scenic Road and Martin Way overlooking Carmel Point and Carmel Bay in 1936.

In 1921, the Abalone League had its beginning on Carmel Point after World War I. A rough diamond at the Point was near Charles Van Riper's house, who built one of the first homes on Carmel Point. A plaque outside the house reads: "This was the site of the Charles and Helen van Riper house. In 1921, Charles and friends Thorne Taylor and Tal Josselyn founded the first softball league in the Western United States, dubbed the Abalone League. Games were played on Carmel Point, directly below the Van-Riper house." A. Carlyle Stoney built his home on Carmel Point, on the third base line of the baseball field.

The Mrs. Clinton Walker House, also known as Cabin on the Rocks,  was built on Carmel Point, on the beach side of Scenic Road. The house was designed by architect Frank Lloyd Wright in 1948 and completed in 1951 for Mrs. Clinton Della Walker of Pebble Beach, California. It was listed on the National Register of Historic Places in 1977.

The Mid-century modern  Butterfly House, was built in 1951 for $135,000 by architect Francis W. Wynkoop. He lived in the house until 1955. It is one of the few houses that is on the ocean front at Carmel Point. The second one he built on Carmel Point is a mid-century modern Expressionist-style house that was built in 1953 on Scenic Road.

Selected Carmel Point homes

Climate
Carmel Point has a cool summer Mediterranean climate (Köppen climate classification Csb), which is normal in coastal areas of California. Summers are typically mild, with overcast mornings produced by marine layer clouds, which can bring drizzles that typically gives way to clear skies in the afternoon.

The wet season is from October to May.

Gallery

See also
 List of places in California
 Timeline of Carmel-by-the-Sea, California
 Historic Homes in Carmel Point

References

External links

 Recollections with Colin Kuster and Anthony Van Riper
 Carmel Point

Unincorporated communities in Monterey County, California
1902 establishments in California
Populated places established in 1922
Populated coastal places in California
Unincorporated communities in California